Lundi Gras is a relatively recently popularized name for a series of Shrove Monday events taking place during the Mardi Gras. It includes the tradition of Rex, king of the New Orleans carnival, and Zulu King arriving by boat. This began in 1874, but the term Lundi Gras (French for "Fat Monday") was not widely applied until 1987 when the arrival was brought back as part of a series of river-related events under the name of "Lundi Gras". Lundi Gras was the creation of journalist Errol Laborde. The event was staged with the cooperation of Riverwalk Marketplace and its then marketing director Carol Thistle Lentz. The events are detailed in Laborde's book, Krewe: The Early New Orleans Carnival from Comus to Zulu.

19th-century beginnings
In , 18 years after the beginning of modern Carnival celebrations in New Orleans, Rex chose to have a grand arrival in New Orleans from the Mississippi River. Once on dry land, Rex and his royal court were placed in carriages and driven through the streets to City Hall. Therein, the mayor and various city officials would present King with the keys to the city and proclaim the rule of Rex in this mystical and temporary realm of Carnival. Typically, the proclamation decreed the beginning of Mardi Gras and Rex's reign at sunrise the following morning.

The Rex landing was a success, quickly becoming a treasured part of the Carnival celebrations which was unique to New Orleans, but no other country or parishes observed the Monday before Shrovetide. The landing continued until World War I stopped Carnival in New Orleans. When the parades again returned to the streets some two years later, the landing had fallen by the wayside, a seeming casualty of "the war to end war".

20th-century revival
In 1971, the landing was recreated for one time only to celebrate Rex's centennial.
In 1987, Rex once again made a grand arrival on the Riverfront at the foot of Canal Street but now with the phrase Lundi Gras attached to the events which would include concerts and fireworks.

The King of the Zulu Social Aid & Pleasure Club also participates in the modern version of the event; the Mayor of New Orleans usually attends as well to salute the two Carnival monarchs and turn over symbolic control of the city for the following day.

The chronology of the term's usage in the common language of the New Orleans carnival is generally misunderstood. While there has been some earlier historic use of the term not confined to New Orleans, the current Lundi Gras, referring to a group of New Orleans riverfront activities, is a relatively new rather than an old carnival custom.

See also 
 Carnival
 Mardi Gras
 Shrove Monday
 Clean Monday
 Collop Monday
 Rosenmontag
 Nickanan Night

References

Errol Laborde, "Krewe: The Early New Orleans Carnival From Comust to Zulu" 2007, Carnival Press.
Robert Tallant, "Mardi Gras"  (Louisiana Edition)  1947, Doubleday & Co.
Perry Young, "The Mystick Krewe: Chronicles of Comus and his Kin" (1969 re-issue) Louisiana Heritage Press (#376 of 1,000)
Henri Schindler, "Mardi Gras:  New Orleans"  1997, Flammarion
The Compleat Carnival Compendium & Mardi Gras Manual, online at carlnivale.theatricana.com

Mardi Gras in New Orleans